Ceratonereis is a genus of polychaete worms from the family Nereididae.

Species
The following species are assigned to Ceratonereis:

 Ceratonereis brunnea Langerhans, 1884
 Ceratonereis dawydovi (Fauvel, 1937)
 Ceratonereis debilis (Grube, 1857)
 Ceratonereis divaricata (Grube, 1878)
 Ceratonereis dorsolineata (Horst, 1924)
 Ceratonereis fallax (Quatrefages, 1866)
 Ceratonereis gracilis (Webster, 1884)
 Ceratonereis hastifera (Fauvel, 1937)
 Ceratonereis hemphrichii (Grube, 1873)
 Ceratonereis imperfecta (Gravier & Dantan, 1934)
 Ceratonereis incisa (Gravier & Dantan, 1934)
 Ceratonereis japonica Imajima, 1972
 Ceratonereis kardagica (Vinogradov, 1933)
 Ceratonereis longicirrata Perkins, 1980
 Ceratonereis marmorata (Horst, 1924)
 Ceratonereis mirabilis Kinberg, 1865
 Ceratonereis obockensis Gravier, 1901
 Ceratonereis obockensis Gravier, 1902
 Ceratonereis obocki Gravier, 1899
 Ceratonereis pectinifera (Grube, 1878)
 Ceratonereis tentaculata Kinberg, 1866
 Ceratonereis ternatensis (Fischli, 1900)
 Ceratonereis tripartita Horst, 1918

References

Polychaete genera
Phyllodocida